The Medical functional constituency was a functional constituency in the elections for the Legislative Council of Hong Kong first created as one of the 12 functional constituency seats created for the 1985 Legislative Council election. It corresponds to the Medical Subsector in the Election Committee.  Electors include all medical participators and dentists. It was combined with Health Services into Medical and Health Services functional constituency in the major electoral overhaul in 2021.

Return members

Electoral results

2010s

2000s

1990s

1980s

References

Constituencies of Hong Kong
Constituencies of Hong Kong Legislative Council
Functional constituencies (Hong Kong)
1985 establishments in Hong Kong
Constituencies established in 1985
2021 disestablishments in Hong Kong
Constituencies disestablished in 2021